Lara Baars (born 23 December 1996) is a Dutch Paralympic athlete competing in shot put and discus throw events. She was born with achondroplasia, a form of dwarfism.

She represented the Netherlands at the 2016 Summer Paralympics in Rio de Janeiro, Brazil and she won the bronze medal in the women's shot put F40 event.

At the 2015 IPC Athletics World Championships in Doha, Qatar, she won the silver medal in the women's shot put F40 event.

At the 2018 World Para Athletics European Championships in Berlin, Germany, she won the silver medal in the women's shot put F40 event and the bronze medal in the women's discus throw F41 event. The following year, she competed in the women's shot put F40 event at the 2019 World Para Athletics Championships held in Dubai, United Arab Emirates where she finished in 5th place with a new personal best of 7.47 m.

She won two medals at the 2021 World Para Athletics European Championships in Bydgoszcz, Poland: she won silver in the shot put F40 event and bronze in the discus throw F41 event.

References

External links 
 

Living people
1996 births
Place of birth missing (living people)
Paralympic athletes of the Netherlands
Dutch female discus throwers
Dutch female shot putters
Athletes (track and field) at the 2016 Summer Paralympics
Medalists at the 2016 Summer Paralympics
Paralympic bronze medalists for the Netherlands
Competitors in athletics with dwarfism
Paralympic medalists in athletics (track and field)
Medalists at the World Para Athletics Championships
Medalists at the World Para Athletics European Championships
21st-century Dutch women